The Nahuan or Aztecan languages are those languages of the Uto-Aztecan language family that have undergone a sound change, known as Whorf's law, that changed an original *t to  before *a. The best known Nahuan language is Nahuatl. Nahuatl is spoken by about 1.7 million Nahua peoples.

Some authorities, such as the Mexican government, Ethnologue, and Glottolog, consider the varieties of modern Nahuatl to be distinct languages, because they are often mutually unintelligible and their speakers have distinct ethnic identities. As of 2008, the Mexican government recognizes thirty varieties that are spoken in Mexico as languages (see the list below).

Researchers distinguish between several dialect areas that each have a number of shared features: One classification scheme distinguishes innovative central dialects, spoken around Mexico City, from conservative peripheral ones spoken north, south and east of the central area, while another scheme distinguishes a basic split between western and eastern dialects.  Nahuan languages include not just varieties known as Nahuatl, but also Pipil and the extinct Pochutec language.

Intelligibility
The differences among the varieties of Nahuatl are not trivial, and in many cases result in low or no mutual intelligibility: people who speak one variety cannot understand or be understood by those from another. Thus, by that criterion, they could be considered different languages. The ISO divisions referenced below respond to intelligibility more than to historical or reconstructional considerations. Like the higher-level groupings, they also are not self-evident and are subject to considerable controversy.

Nevertheless, the variants all are clearly related and more closely related to each other than to Pochutec, and they and Pochutec are more closely related to each other than to any other Uto-Aztecan languages (such as Cora or Huichol, Tepehuán and Tarahumara, Yaqui/Mayo, etc.)

Historical linguistic research 
Little work has been done in the way of the historical linguistics of Nahuatl proper or the Aztecan (nowadays often renamed Nahuan) branch of Uto-Aztecan.

Lyle Campbell and Ronald W. Langacker (1978), in a paper whose focus was the internal reconstruction of the vowels of Proto-Aztecan (or Proto-Nahuan), made two proposals of lasting impact regarding the internal classification of the Aztecan branch. Second, they adduced new arguments for dividing the branch in two subdivisions: Pochutec, whose sole member is the Pochutec language, which became extinct sometime in the 20th century, and General Aztec, which includes the Pipil language and all dialects spoken in Mexico which are clearly closely related to the extinct literary language, Classical Nahuatl. This binary division of Aztecan (Nahuan) was already the majority opinion among specialists, but Campbell and Langacker's new arguments were received as being compelling. Furthermore, in "adopt[ing] the term 'General Aztec' ", they may in fact have been the ones to introduce this designation. Part of their reconstruction of the Proto-Aztecan vowels was disputed by Dakin (1983).

The most comprehensive study of the history of Nahuan languages is Una Canger's "Five Studies inspired by Nahuatl verbs in -oa" (Canger 1980), in which she explores the historical development of grammar of the verbs ending in -oa and -ia.  Canger shows that verbs in -oa and -ia are historically and grammatically distinct from verbs in -iya and -owa, although they are not distinguished in pronunciation in any modern dialects. She shows the historical basis for the five verb classes, based on how they form the perfect tense-aspect, and she shows that all of the different forms of the perfect tense-aspect derives from a single -ki morpheme that has developed differently depending on the phonological shape of the verb to which it was suffixed. She also explains the historical development of the applicative suffix with the shape -lia and -lwia as coming from a single suffix of the shape -liwa.

Dakin has proposed a historical internal classification of Nahuan, e.g., Dakin (2000). She asserts two groups of migrations in central Mexico and eventually southwards to Central America. The first produced Eastern dialects. Centuries later, the second group of migrations produced Western dialects. But many modern dialects are the result of blending between particular Eastern dialects and particular Western dialects.

Campbell in his grammar of Pipil (1985) discussed the problem of classifying Pipil. Pipil is either a descendant of Nahuatl (in his estimation) or still to this day a variety of Nahuatl (in the estimation of for example Lastra de Suárez (1986) and Dakin (2001)).

Dakin (1982) is a book-length study (in Spanish) of the phonological evolution of Proto-Nahuatl. Dakin (1991) suggested that irregularities in the modern Nahuatl system of possessive prefixes might be due to the presence in Proto-Nahuan of distinct grammatical marking for two types of possession.

In the 1990s, two papers appeared addressing the old research problem of the "saltillo" in Nahuatl: a lost paper by Whorf (1993), and Manaster Ramer (1995).

Modern Nahuan languages and their classification 
A Center-Periphery scheme was introduced by Canger in 1978, and supported by comparative historical data in 1980.  Lastra de Suarez's (1986) dialect atlas that divided dialects into center and peripheral areas based on strictly synchronic evidence. The subsequent 1988 article by Canger adduced further historical evidence for this division.(Dakin 2003:261).

Studies of individual dialects 
Until the middle of the 20th century, scholarship on Nahuan languages was limited almost entirely to the literary language that existed approximately 1540–1770 (which is now known as Classical Nahuatl, although the descriptor "classical" was never used until the 20th century). Since the 1930s, there have appeared several grammars of individual modern dialects (in either article or book form), in addition to articles of narrower scope.

Classification 
The history of research into Nahuan dialect classification in the 20th century up to 1988 has been reviewed by Canger (1988). Benjamin Lee Whorf (1937) had performed an analysis and concluded that  was the reflex of Proto-Uto-Aztecan  before  (a conclusion which has been borne out).

As a geographical note: the northern part of the State of Puebla is universally recognized as having two subgroupings. The northern part of the State of Puebla is a long north to south lobe. In the middle of it from east-northeast to west-southwest runs the Sierra de Puebla (as Nahuanist linguists call it) or Sierra Norte de Puebla (as geographers call it). The "Sierra de Puebla" dialects are quite distinct from the "northern Puebla" dialects, which are spoken in northernmost Puebla State and very small parts of neighboring states.

Eastern–Western division 
Dakin (2003:261) gives the following classification of Nahuatl dialects (in which the word "north" has been replaced by "northern"), based on her earlier publications, e.g., Dakin (2000).
Eastern Nahuatl
Huastec
Guerrero
Sierra Puebla
Tehuacán–Zongolica
Isthmus
Pipil
Western Nahuatl
Central Nahuatl
"Classical" Nahuatl
Tlaxcala–Puebla
Central Puebla
Ometepec
Northern Puebla
Western Peripheral
Mexicanero
Coatepec
Temascaltepec
Michoacán
Pochutec

Most specialists in Pipil (El Salvador) consider it to have diverged from Nahuatl to the point it should no longer be considered a variety of Nahuatl. Most specialists in Nahuan do not consider Pochutec to have ever been a variety of Nahuatl.

Center–Periphery division
Canger (1978; 1980) and Lastra de Suarez (1986) have made classification schemes based on data and methodology which each investigator has well documented.  Canger proposed a single Central grouping and several Peripheral groupings. The Center grouping is hypothesized to have arisen during the Aztec Empire by diffusion of the defining feature (an innovative verb form) and other features from the prestigious dialect of the capital. The dialects which adopted it could be from multiple genetic divisions of General Aztec. As for the various Peripheral groupings, their identity as Peripheral is defined negatively, i.e., by their lack the grammatical feature which, it is proposed, defines the Central grouping. Canger recognized the possibility that centuries of population migrations and other grammatical feature diffusions may have combined to obscure the genetic relationships (the branching evolution) among the dialects of Nahuatl.

Some of the isoglosses used by Canger to establish the Peripheral vs. Central dialectal dichotomy are these:

Lastra de Suárez in her Nahuatl dialect atlas (1986) affirmed the concept of the Center/Periphery geographic dichotomy, but amended Canger's assignment of some subgroupings to the Center or the Periphery. The three most important divergences are probably those involving Huastec dialects, Sierra de Zongolica dialects, and northwestern Guerrero dialects. Lastra classifies these as Peripheral, Central, and Central, respectively, while in each case Canger does the opposite.

The dialectal situation is very complex and most categorizations, including the one presented above, are, in the nature of things, controversial.  Lastra wrote, "The isoglosses rarely coincide. As a result, one can give greater or lesser importance to a feature and make the [dialectal] division that one judges appropriate/convenient" (1986:189). And she warned: "We insist that this classification is not [entirely] satisfactory" (1986:190). Both researchers emphasized the need for more data in order for there to be advances in the field of Nahuatl dialectology. Since the 1970s, there has been an increase in research whose immediate aim is the production of grammars and dictionaries of individual dialects. But there is also a detailed study of dialect variation in the dialect subgroup sometimes known as the Zongolica (Andrés Hasler 1996). A. Hasler sums up the difficulty of classifying Zongolica thus (1996:164): "Juan Hasler (1958:338) interprets the presence in the region of [a mix of] eastern dialect features and central dialect features as an indication of a substratum of eastern Nahuatl and a superstratum of central Nahuatl. Una Canger (1980:15–20) classifies the region as part of the eastern area, while Yolanda Lastra (1986:189–190) classifies it as part of the central area."

As already alluded to, the nucleus of the Central dialect territory is the Valley of Mexico. The extinct Classical Nahuatl, the enormously influential language spoken by the people of Tenochtitlan, the Aztec capital, is one of the Central dialects. Lastra in her dialect atlas proposed three Peripheral groupings: eastern, western, and Huasteca. She included Pipil in Nahuatl, assigning it to the Eastern Periphery grouping. Lastra's classification of dialects of modern Nahuatl is as follows (many of the labels refer to Mexican states):
Western Periphery
West coast
Western México State
Durango–Nayarit
Eastern Periphery
Sierra de Puebla
Isthmus
Pipil
Huasteca
Center
Nuclear subarea (in and near Mexico, D.F.)
Puebla–Tlaxcala (areas by the border between the states of Puebla and Tlaxcala)
Xochiltepec–Huatlatlauca (south of the city of Puebla)
Southeastern Puebla (this grouping extends over the Sierra de Zongolica located in the neighboring state of Veracruz)
Central Guerrero (so called; actually northern Guerrero, specifically the region of the Balsas River)
Southern Guerrero

List of Nahuatl dialects recognized by the Mexican government 
This list is taken from the Instituto Nacional de Lenguas Indígenas (INALI)'s Catálogo de Lenguas Indígenas Nacionales. The full document has variations on the names especially “autodenominaciones” ("self designations", the names these dialect communities use for their language), along with lists of towns where each variant is spoken.
 Náhuatl de la Sierra, noreste de Puebla
 Náhuatl del noroeste central
 Náhuatl del Istmo
 Mexicano de la Huasteca veracruzana
 Náhuatl de la Huasteca potosina
 Náhuatl de Oaxaca
 Náhuatl de la Sierra negra, sur
 Náhuatl de la Sierra negra, norte
 Náhuatl central de Veracruz
 Náhuatl de la Sierra oeste
 Náhuatl alto del norte de Puebla
 Náhuatl del Istmo bajo
 Náhuatl del centro de Puebla
 Mexicano bajo de occidente
 Mexicano del noroeste (spoken by Mexicaneros)
 Mexicano de Guerrero
 Mexicano de occidente
 Mexicano central de occidente
 Mexicano central bajo
 Mexicano de Temixco
 Mexicano de Puente de Ixtla
 Mexicano de Tetela del Volcán
 Mexicano alto de occidente (spoken by Mexicaneros)
 Mexicano del oriente
 Mexicano del oriente central
 Mexicano del centro bajo
 Mexicano del centro alto
 Mexicano del centro
 Mexicano del oriente de Puebla
 Mexicano de la Huasteca Hidalguense

List of Nahuatl dialects recognized in ISO 639-3, ordered by number of speakers 
(name [ISO subgroup code] – location(s) ~approx. number of speakers)
 Eastern Huasteca [nhe] – Hidalgo, Western Veracruz, Northern Puebla  ~450,000
 Western Huasteca [nhw] – San Luis Potosí, Western Hidalgo  ~450,000
 Guerrero [ngu] – Guerrero  ~200,000
 Orizaba [nlv] – Central Veracruz  ~140,000
 Southeastern Puebla [nhs] – Southeast Puebla  ~135,000
 Highland Puebla [azz] – Puebla Highlands  ~125,000
 Northern Puebla [ncj] – Northern Puebla  ~66,000
 Central [nhn] – Tlaxcala, Puebla  ~50,000
 Isthmus-Mecayapan [nhx] – Southern Veracruz  ~20,000
 Central Puebla [ncx] – Central Puebla  ~18,000
 Morelos [nhm] – Morelos  ~15,000
 Northern Oaxaca [nhy] – Northwestern Oaxaca, Southeastern Puebla  ~10,000
 Huaxcaleca [nhq] – Puebla ~7,000
 Isthmus-Pajapan [nhp] – Southern Veracruz ~7,000
 Isthmus-Cosoleacaque [nhk] – Northwestern Coastal Chiapas, Southern Veracruz  ~5,500
 Tetelcingo [nhg] – Morelos  ~3,500
 Michoacán [ncl] – Michoacán  ~3,000
 Santa María de la Alta [nhz] – Northwest Puebla  ~3,000
 Tenango [nhi] – Northern Puebla  ~2,000
 Tlamacazapa [nuz] – Morelos  ~1,500
 Coatepec [naz] – Southwestern México State, Northwestern Guerrero  ~1,500
 Durango [nln] – Southern Durango  ~1,000
 Ometepec [nht] – Southern Guerrero, Western Oaxaca  ~500
 Temascaltepec [nhv] – Southwestern México State  ~300
 Tlalitzlipa [nhj] – Puebla  ~100
 Pipil [ppl] – El Salvador ~500
 Tabasco [nhc] – Tabasco ~30

Geographical distributions of Nahuan languages by ISO code:

See also

Nahuatl
Pochutec
Pipil language
Nahuatl transcription

References

Bibliography

External links

Classical Nahuatl at SIL-MX
Guerrero Nahuatl at SIL-MX
Isthmus-Mecayapan Nahuatl at SIL-MX
Morelos Nahuatl at SIL-MX
Northern Oaxaca Nahuatl at SIL-MX
Orizaba Nawatl at SIL-MX
Tenango Nahuatl at SIL-MX
Tetelcingo Nahuatl at SIL-MX
ELAR archive of Documentation of Nahuatl Knowledge of Natural History, Material Culture, and Ecology

 
Agglutinative languages
Nahuatl
Dialects by language